Phi Kappa Psi, also called "Phi Psi," is an American collegiate social fraternity founded at Jefferson College in Canonsburg, Pennsylvania on February 19, 1852.  There are 95 chapters and six colonies at accredited four year colleges and universities throughout the United States. More than 140,000 men have been initiated into Phi Kappa Psi since its founding.

The Phi Kappa Psi Fraternity is composed of chapters and alumni associations, the former of which is the scope of this list.  Each chapter is chartered to an individual host institution.  These host institutions must be accredited four year degree granting colleges and universities in a state, province, territory, or federal district of Canada or the United States.  To date, chapter charters have only been granted to groups at U.S. institutions.

When Phi Kappa Psi is extending to an institution that does not currently have a chapter, a probationary group called a "colony" is formed.  After criteria are met, that colony receives its charter and becomes a chapter.

A chapter becomes inactive when it relinquishes its charter, or the charter is revoked by the fraternity.

Chapter naming convention

The chapter naming convention is composed of the top level subnational division of that chapter's host institution, and a Greek letter in alphabetical order from when the charter was originally issued.  For example, the first Phi Psi chapter is from Jefferson College in Canonsburg, Pennsylvania.  The first letter in the Greek  alphabet is Alpha.  The chapter name is Pennsylvania Alpha.  The second chapter was installed at the University of Virginia, so it is the Virginia Alpha chapter.  The third chapter was installed at Washington & Lee University, in Virginia, so it is the Virginia Beta chapter.  The George Washington University chapter is only one ever chartered in the District of Columbia, so it is the District of Columbia Alpha chapter.

If borders change, the chapter name does not.  Virginia Delta was chartered at Bethany College in 1859.  After the Civil War, Bethany College was in West Virginia, but the chapter remained Virginia Delta.

Chapters are named based on when the charter is granted, not when it is installed.  As a result, there have been rare instances when the chapter naming convention may not appear to be consistent with the charter dates.  For example, four charters have been granted in Iowa.  The second granted was the fourth installed, so Iowa Beta chartered after Iowa Gamma and Iowa Delta.

List of chapters and colonies
Italicization of an entire row indicates an inactive chapter or a colony.
The S column indicates the status of a chapter or colony:

The # column indicates order in which each chapter was originally chartered.

Footnotes

References

Books

Periodicals

Websites

External links

Chapter locator

chapters
Lists of chapters of United States student societies by society